Maria Paula Heitmann (born 31 January 1999 in Belo Horizonte) is a Brazilian swimmer.

She was at the 2017 Summer Universiade in Taipei, Taiwan.

At the 2018 José Finkel Trophy, she broke the South American record in 4×200m freestyle relay with a time of 7:50.57 along with Ana Carolina Vieira, Camila Mello and Andressa Cholodovskis.

She was at the 2022 World Aquatics Championships held in Budapest, Hungary. In the Brazilian 4x200m freestyle relay, formed by Heitmann, Giovanna Diamante, Aline Rodrigues and Stephanie Balduccini, she finished in 6th place with a time of 7:58.38. This was the best placement of Brazil in this race in Worlds at all times. 

On 13 September 2022, at the José Finkel Trophy in Recife, she broke the short course South American record in the 400-metre freestyle, with a time of 4:03.45.

References

1999 births
Living people
Brazilian female freestyle swimmers
Sportspeople from Belo Horizonte
Competitors at the 2017 Summer Universiade
Indiana Hoosiers women's swimmers
21st-century Brazilian women
South American Games gold medalists for Brazil
South American Games medalists in swimming
Competitors at the 2022 South American Games